Gerald J. Wasserburg (March 25, 1927 – June 13, 2016) was an American geologist. At the time of his death, he was the John D. MacArthur Professor of Geology and Geophysics, Emeritus, at the California Institute of Technology. He was known for his work in the fields of  isotope geochemistry, cosmochemistry, meteoritics, and astrophysics.

After leaving the US army, where he received the Combat Infantryman Badge, he graduated from high school and attended college on the G.I. Bill. Wasserburg completed his Ph.D. from the University of Chicago in 1954, with a thesis on the development of K–Ar dating, done under the sponsorship of Prof. H. C. Urey and Prof M. G. Inghram. He joined the faculty at Caltech in 1955 as Assistant Professor. He became Associate Professor in 1959 and Professor of Geology and Geophysics in 1962. In 1982 he became the John D. MacArthur Professor of Geology and Geophysics; he retired in 2001. He, Typhoon Lee and D.A. Papanastassiou discovered the presence of short-lived radioactive 26Al in the early solar system and short-lived 107Pd with William R. Kelly.

Wasserburg was deeply involved in the Apollo Program with the  returned Lunar samples, including being a member of the so-called "Four Horsemen", along with Bob Walker, Jim Arnold, and Paul Werner Gast. He pioneered the precise measurement of ultra-small samples under strict clean room conditions with minimal contamination. He was the co-inventor of the Lunatic Spectrometer (the first fully digital mass spectrometer with computer-controlled magnetic field scanning & rapid switching) and founder of the "Lunatic Asylum" research laboratory at Caltech specializing in high precision, high sensitivity isotopic analyses  of meteorites, lunar and terrestrial samples. He and his co-workers were major contributors to establishing a chronology for the Moon and proposed the hypothesis of the Late Heavy Bombardment (LHB) of the whole inner solar system at near 4.0 Gy ago (with F. Tera, D. A. Papanastassiou).

Wasserburg's research led to a better understanding of the origins and history of the solar system and its component bodies and the precursor stellar sources contributing to the solar system; this research established a time scale for the development of the early solar system, including the processes of nucleosynthesis and the formation and evolution of the planets, the Moon and the meteorites. More recently, he investigated models of the chemical evolution of the Galaxy.

He was a member of the U.S. National Academy of Sciences, the American Philosophical Society, the American Academy of Arts and Sciences, and the Norwegian Academy of Science and Letters. He won the Arthur L. Day Medal in 1970, the NASA Distinguished Public Service Medal in 1972 and 1978, the Wollaston Medal in 1985, the Gold Medal of the Royal Astronomical Society in 1991 and the Bowie Medal in 2008. He was co-winner, with Claude Allègre, of the Crafoord Prize in Geosciences in 1986. He was the recipient of several honorary degrees. He was recipient of the J.F.Kemp Medal with Paul W. Gast Columbia Univ 1973,the H. Hess Medal of the American Geophysical Union in 1985,the Leonard Medal of the Meteoritical Soc. 1975,the J.Lawrence Smith Medal of the National Academy of Science 1985, the Arthur L. Day Prize & Lectureship of the National Academy of Science 1981, the Holmes Medal of the European Union of Geosciences in 1986 and the V. M. Goldschmidt medal of the Geochemical society  in 1978.

Minor planet 4765 Wasserburg is named in his honor. 
He is survived by his sons Charles and Daniel Wasserburg, as well his grandchildren Ori, Philip, Roscoe and Benjamin Wasserburg.

References 
 
 
 
 
 Isotopic Adventures (autobiography)  Annu.Rev. Earth Planet Sci.2003,v31,1-74 http://www.annualreviews.org/doi/abs/10.1146/annurev.earth.31.100901.141409

External links
Interview with Gerald J. Wasserburg for NOVA series: To the Moon WGBH Educational Foundation, raw footage, 1998

1927 births
2016 deaths
American geologists
California Institute of Technology faculty
University of Chicago alumni
Recipients of the Gold Medal of the Royal Astronomical Society
Members of the Norwegian Academy of Science and Letters
Members of the United States National Academy of Sciences
Wollaston Medal winners
American geochemists
American geophysicists
American astrophysicists
Recipients of the V. M. Goldschmidt Award